The Tönsheide Forest is a nature reserve near the village of Aukrug east of  Neumünster in the north German state of Schleswig-Holstein.

It consists of large areas of near-natural woodland, scattered with areas of heath. In the woods are the source area and upper reaches of the  Sellbek.

External links 
 "Tönsheider Wald" nature reserve law

Nature reserves in Schleswig-Holstein
Forests and woodlands of Germany
Aukrug